In geometry, the five circles theorem states that, given five circles centered on a common sixth circle and intersecting each other chainwise on the same circle, the lines joining their second intersection points forms a pentagram whose points lie on the circles themselves.

See also
 Clifford's circle theorems
 Miquel's theorem
 Six circles theorem
 Seven circles theorem

References

External links
 
 

Theorems about circles